Pheidole oculata is a species of ant in the subfamily Myrmicinae. It is endemic to Madagascar.

References

External links
 

oculata
Hymenoptera of Africa
Insects of Madagascar
Endemic fauna of Madagascar
Insects described in 1899
Taxa named by Carlo Emery
Taxonomy articles created by Polbot